Uses and gratifications theory (UGT) is an approach to understanding why and how people actively seek out specific media to satisfy specific needs. UGT is an audience-centered approach to understanding mass communication. Diverging from other media effect theories that question "what does media do to people?", UGT instead focuses on "what do people do with media?"
It postulates that media is a highly available product and the audiences are the consumers of the same product.

This communication theory is positivistic in its approach, based in the socio-psychological communication tradition, and focuses on communication at the mass media scale. The driving question of UGT is: Why do people use media and what do they use them for? UGT discusses how users deliberately choose media that will satisfy given needs and allow one to enhance knowledge, relaxation, social interactions/companionship, diversion, or escape.

UGT assumes that audience members are not passive consumers of media. Rather, the audience has power over their media consumption and assumes an active role in interpreting and integrating media into their own lives. Unlike other theoretical perspectives, UGT holds that audiences are responsible for choosing media to meet their desires and needs to achieve gratification. This theory would then imply that the media compete against other information sources for viewers' gratification.

UGT has a heuristic value today because it gives communication scholars a "perspective through which a number of ideas and theories about media choice, consumption, and even impact can be viewed".

Origin and History
Uses and gratifications theory was developed from a number of prior communication theories and research conducted by fellow theorists.

Stage 1: The basic premise dating back to the 1940s 

 Beginning in the 1940s, researchers began to see patterns under the perspective of the uses and gratifications theory in radio listeners. Early research was concerned with topics such as children's use of comics and the absence of newspapers during a newspaper strike. An interest in more psychological interpretations emerged during this time period.
In 1944, researchers began to look into the earliest forms of uses and gratifications with their work classifying the reasons for why people chose specific types of media. Herta Herzog interviewed various soap opera fans and was able to identify three types of gratifications based on why people listened to soap operas: emotional, wishful thinking, and learning.
In 1948, Lasswell introduced a four-functional interpretation of the media on a macro-sociological level. Media served the functions of surveillance, correlation, entertainment and cultural transmission for both society and individuals.
According to Richard West and Lynn Turner, UGT was an extension of Needs and Motivation Theory, as outlined by Abraham Maslow in 1954, which argues that people actively looked to satisfy their needs based on a hierarchy. These needs are organized as Maslow's Hierarchy of Needs in the form of a pyramid with the largest, most fundamental needs at the base and the need for self-actualization at the top. From the bottom-up the pyramid contains Biological/Physical, Security/Safety, Social/Belonging, Ego/Self-Respect and Self-actualization at the top.
In 1954, Wilbur Schramm developed the fraction of selection, a formula for determining which form of mass media an individual would select. The formula helped to decide the amount of gratification an individual would expect to gain from the medium over how much effort they had to make to achieve gratification. Elihu Katz, Jay Blumler, and Michael Gurevitch synthesized that UGT's approach was focused on "the social and psychological origins of needs, which generate expectations of the mass media or other sources, which lead to differential patterns of media exposure (or engagement in other activities), resulting in need gratifications and some other consequences, perhaps mostly unintended ones."

Stage 2: Five assumptions proposed in 1970s 
In 1969 Jay Blumler and Denis McQuail studied the 1964 election in the United Kingdom by examining people's motives for watching certain political programs on television. By categorizing the audience's motives for viewing a certain program, they aimed to classify viewers according to their needs in order to understand any potential mass-media effects. The audience motivations they were able to identify helped lay the groundwork for their research in 1972 and eventually uses and gratifications theory.
In 1972 McQuail, Blumler and Joseph Brown suggested that the uses of different types of media could be grouped into 4 categories. The four categories were: (1) Diversion: escape from routine or problems; emotional release; (2) Personal relationships: companionship; social utility; (3) Personal identity: self reference; reality exploration; value reinforces; and (4) Surveillance (forms of information seeking).
In 1973-74 McQuail, Blumler and Brown were joined by Elihu Katz, Michael Gurevitch and Hadassah Haas, in their media exploration. The collaborative research began to indicate how people saw the mass media. Five basic assumptions were stated in a study of Katz, Blumler, and Gurevitch in 1974 as follows. They provide a framework for understanding the correlation between media and audiences:
The audience is conceived as active.
In the mass communication process, much initiative in linking gratification and media choice lies with the audience member.
The media compete with other sources of satisfaction.
Methodologically speaking, many of the goals of mass media use can be derived from data supplied by individual audience members themselves.
Value judgments about the cultural significance of mass communication should be suspended while audience orientations are explored on their own terms.

 According to the research, goals for media use can be grouped into five uses. The audience wants to:
be informed or educated
identify with characters of the situation in the media environment
simple entertainment
enhance social interaction
escape from the stresses of daily life

Stage 3: Applications of UGT since 1980s 
In the 1980s, Rehman (1983) applied UGT to study the relationship between the movie audience expectations and satisfaction derived from going to the movies.
In 1984, Professor Alan Rubin identified 2 main types of television viewers: ritualized (habitual) users and instrumental (non-habitual) users. Rubin defined the ritualized users as individuals who had a high regard for television, used television often, and primarily used it for the purpose of a diversion. Meanwhile, the instrumental users were defined as having a lower regard for television, did not use it often, and when they would use television it was for the purpose of acquiring information.
Additionally in 1984, Mark Levy and Sven Windahl identified 3 types of audience activity which they labeled as preactivity, duractivity, and postactivity. Levy and Windahl described "preactivity" as seeking out certain media to gratify intellectual needs, "duractivity" as focusing on deciphering and interpreting messages, and "postactivity" as seeking out a message for personal or interpersonal benefit.
 A year later, in 1985, Levy and Windahl provided a description of what it means to be an "active consumer" of media:
"As commonly understood by gratifications researchers, the term "audience activity" postulates a voluntaristic and selective orientation by audiences toward the communication process. In brief, it suggests that media use is motivated by needs and goals that are defined by audience members themselves, and that active participation in the communication process may facilitate, limit, or otherwise influence the gratifications and effects associated with exposure. Current thinking also suggests that audience activity is best conceptualized as a variable construct, with audiences exhibiting varying kinds and degrees of activity."
In 1987, researchers Lewis Donohew, Philip Palmgreen, and J.D. Rayburn identified 4 different lifestyle types of television viewers:
Type I: Disengaged homemaker
Type II: Outgoing activist
Type III: Restrained activist
Type IV: Working class climber
Each type has a variety of differences from the degrees to which the audience member watches TV, why they watch it, what their income and gender is, their marriage status, and so on.

In 2010s, the most recent interest surrounding UGT is the link between the reason why media is used and the achieved gratification. UGT researchers are developing the theory to be more predictive and explanatory by connecting the needs, goals, benefits, and consequences of media consumption and use along with individual factors. Work in UGT was trailblazing because the research of Katz, Blumler, and Gurevitch built on Herzog's research and caused a paradigm shift from how media influences people to how audiences use media, diminishing the dominance of the limited effects approach to mass media studies.

Gratifications sought (GS) vs. gratifications obtained (GO) 
Gratifications sought (GS) and gratifications obtained (GO) is one of the research issues dealing with U&G theory, and it is a contrast between "what you were seeking from experience" versus "what you actually got from the experience - whether it was a satisfying experience or not."

The personal motivations for media use suggest that the media offer gratifications which are expected by audiences. These gratifications can be thought of as experienced psychological effects which are valued by individuals. In 1980s, Palmgreen and Rayburn thus proposed a model of the gratifications sought (GS) and gratifications obtained (GO) process. GS refers to the rewards people seek from media. GO refers to the rewards people receive from media.

In 1980, to investigate the relationship between GS and GO, Palmgreen et al. conducted a study of gratifications sought and obtained from the most popular television news programs. This study investigated the relationship between gratifications sought (GS) from television news and gratifications obtained (GO) from network evening news programs Each GS correlated moderately to strongly with its corresponding GO for the respondent's most-watched program. Correlations between each GS and noncorresponding GOs were generally much lower. The findings indicate considerable promise for a sought versus obtained conceptualization of uses and gratifications.

In 1985, Palmgreen et al. conducted an investigation that provides support for a process model of uses and gratifications based upon an expectancy-value approach. Results of the study supported the hypothesis that gratifications obtained are strongly related to the beliefs about media attributes but are not related to evaluations of those attributes. Also, the belief X evaluation products are correlated with gratifications obtained. When controls were instituted for certain intervening variables posited by the model, the hypothesized reductions in various relationships occurred. The model has significant implications for media consumption processes. Further, the results demonstrated that gratifications sought and obtained may be measured at the same level of abstraction, contrary to earlier speculation.

Modern applications of uses and gratifications research
The studies of Katz and his colleagues laid a theoretical foundation of building the uses and gratifications approach. Since then, the research on this subject has been strengthened and extended. The current status of uses and gratifications is still based on Katz's first analysis, particularly as new media forms have emerged in such an electronic information age when people have more options of media use.

Mobile phone usage
Mobile phones, a comparatively new technology, have many uses and gratifications attached to them. Due to their nature of mobility, constant access, and options to both add and access content, this field is expanding with new research on the motivations behind using mobile phones.

In general, people use mobile phones for the following uses and gratifications:
Affection/sociability
Entertainment
Fashion/status
Immediate access
Instrumentality
Mobility
Psychological reassurance

Uses and gratifications do, however, differ based on location and audience:
Using mobile phones on buses, cars, and trains is related to the UG of mobility and immediate access
Talking to business partners is related to the UG of instrumentality
Talking to family members is related to the UG of mobility and affection

The specific function of text messaging has been studied to find its uses and gratifications and explore any potential gender differences. The researchers proposed seven uses and gratifications; they are listed below, from highest to lowest ranked according to the study's results:
Accessibility/mobility
Relaxation
Escape
Entertainment
Information seeking
Coordination for business
Socialization/affection seeking
Status seeking

The results also displayed gender differences (in an undergraduate population): women scored the UG of accessibility/mobility, relaxation and escape, and coordination higher than the men did. These results may imply social and societal expectations for females around independence but connected to family and friends and/or a tendency for women to rely more on detailed conversation in text messaging than men.

Since many now use their mobile phones as devices to connect to the internet and both contribute and retrieve content, researchers have investigated the UG of smart devices which engage multiple media. The uses and gratifications for contributing mobile content differ from those for retrieving mobile content. 
Contribution: Leisure, entertainment, easy access, and passing time are all motivations for adding material.
Retrieval: Efficient access of information resources/services and the need for high quality information are uses and gratifications for accessing content.

Internet usage
The Internet provides a new and deep field for exploring UGT. It was found to have three main categories of gratifications: content gratification, process gratification, and social gratification.
Content: Uses for the Internet include the need for researching or finding specific information or material, which are gratified with content.
Process: Users gain gratification from the experience of purposeful navigating or random browsing of the Internet in its functional process.
Social: Uses encompass a wide range of forming and deepening social ties.

Scholars like LaRose et al. utilize UGT to understand Internet usage via a socio-cognitive framework to reduce uncertainties that arise from homogenizing an Internet audience and explaining media usage in terms of only positive outcomes (gratifications). LaRose et al. created measures for self-efficacy and self-disparagement and related UGT to negative outcomes of online behavior (like Internet addiction) as well.

Social media usage
Recent research has looked at social networking services, personal and subject-based blogs, and internet forums put together to study the U&G in posting social content, the relationship between gratifications and narcissism, and the effects of age on this relationship and these gratifications. Users have motivations of the following overall:
Social and affection
Need to vent negative feelings
Recognition
Entertainment
Cognitive needs

Forums were found to be the main media for venting negative feelings, potentially due to the fact that comparatively, forums are more of a one-way street. Use of social media cures loneliness and satisfies a compulsion for addictive behaviors. Similar to the variables of gender, location, and audience as previous research has found, the U&G differed by category of narcissism. The researchers found four multi-dimensional narcissistic personality types: feeling authoritative or superior, exhibitionistic, exploitative, and often hungry for vanity. The U&G differed depending on the specific type of narcissism a given user had. For instance, those who were exhibitionistic tended to focus on the social media U&G of showing affection, expressing negative feelings, and being recognized. Those who viewed themselves as superior had higher uses and gratifications by cognitive motivations than by recognition. The vain narcissists were most gratified by recognition and attention, and they did not vent negative feelings. Exhibitionists were motivated by all gratifications of social media. No generational differences were found in the narcissistic tendencies.

Friend-networking sites
Basic research finds that socialization motivates use of friend-networking sites such as MySpace and Facebook. The uses and gratifications theory suggests that individual users will continue to be engaged with social networking sites if their gratifications and needs are fulfilled by such tools. Particulars under socialization might be finding old friends, making new friends, learning about events, creating social functions, and feeling connected. Some further exploration has demonstrated that although emotional, cognitive, social, and habitual uses are motivational to use social media, not all uses are consistently gratified. In research examining Facebook groups' users' gratifications in relation to their civic participation offline, 1,715 college students were asked "to rate their level of agreement with specific reasons for using Facebook groups, including information acquisition about campus/community, entertainment/recreation, social interaction with friends and family, and peer pressure/self satisfaction." The study ultimately yielded results through principal components factor analysis with varimax rotation. The results showed that there were four needs for using Facebook groups, "socializing, entertainment, self-status seeking, and information."
Socializing: Students were interested in talking and meeting with others to achieve a sense of community and peer support on the particular topic of the group.
Entertainment: Students engaged with the groups to amuse themselves.
Self-Seeking: Students sought out or maintained their personal status, as well as those of their friends, through the online group participation.
Information: Students used the group to receive information about related events going on and off campus.
In a similar case study, one of the research questions posed was “What are students’ needs and gratifications in pervasively adopting social networking sites?” In this study, the researcher used five categories of uses and gratifications theory to explain the motives behind students’ social media use. The categories are as follows: (i) Purposive value (refers to seeking new knowledge and information), (ii) self-discovery (refers to an individual's motivation to understand aspects of one's self through online group participation), (iii) maintaining interpersonal interconnectivity (refers to the social benefits an individual derives from establishing and maintaining contact with other people in an online network), (iv) social enhancement (refers to values an individual derives from gaining acceptance and the approval of others as well as enhancing his/her social status within the online network), and (v) entertainment value (refers to the fun and enjoyment an individual derives from interacting with others in an online network). The results indicated that university students show willingness to use social networking sites when they know that others in their social network group have the same values regarding the benefits of such tools and similar needs to establish or maintain satisfying relationships with others in their network. The need for entertainment and maintaining interpersonal interconnectivity with others yielded the largest statistical impact on students’ intentions to use SNSs in this study. This indicates that such tools are largely considered pleasure-oriented platforms through which enjoyment and pleasure can be obtained, and connections with others facilitated.

Uses and Gratifications of Specific Facebook Features 
Since Facebook is such a widely used platform that offers users a variety of different features and functions, researchers have conducted Uses and Gratifications analysis on specific features of the platform such as photo sharing and streaming music. 
Photo Sharing: Researchers have identified six primary needs that users are seeking to gratify by sharing photos on Facebook. Thus, these needs are motivations that can predict photo sharing on Facebook. These specific motivations are: affection, attention seeking, disclosure, habit, information sharing, and social influence These motivations were identified using factor analysis. The same study also used correlation testing to determine that age correlates positively with the motivations of disclosure and social influence and that gender differences exist in the gratifications of habit and disclosure. 
Using Facebook to Listen to Music: In addition to photo sharing, Facebook also allows users to publish their music listening history and listen to music through the platform (San Pascual, 2013). Using a principal axis factor analysis, Krause, North, and Heritage (2014) found three primary motivations for using Facebook music listening applications: communication, entertainment, and habitual diversion.

Twitter
Twitter is an online micro-blogging platform that contains both mass-media functions and interpersonal communication options via sending tweets. Research has found a positive correlation between active time spent on Twitter and the gratification of a need for "an informal sense of camaraderie"—connection—with other users. Furthermore, the frequency of tweets and number of replies and public messages mediated the relationship between Twitter users. This helped increase both use and gratification of the media by satisfying the need for connection.

Snapchat
Snapchat is a photo-sharing social media platform with more than 178 million users worldwide. Similar to other forms of social media, people use Snapchat to fulfill specific media needs, in particular bonding social capital needs. Compared to social media sites such as Twitter, Facebook, and Instagram, Snapchat is used more to fulfill private media needs. For example, Phua, Jin, and Kim found that Snapchat interactions were similar to interactions found in close interpersonal relationships. The application has been used to attain emotional support from others, look for advice on important decisions, and seek help to solve problems, satisfying the need to socialize, vent negative feelings, and connect with others.

Other applications
Many other aspects of UGT are featured in using various websites that are related to social networking. Many review services, such as Yelp.com, have an aspect of social networking, with user profiles and interconnectivity. Many news websites feature the ability to share articles and pictures directly from their page to users' personal social networking pages across platforms. Understandably, information seeking is an overwhelming U&G for these applications, especially the review sites like Yelp.com. Other U&G included entertainment, convenience, interpersonal utility, and passing time. A more sinister aspect of UGT and a reason to use social media establishes a platform for cyberbullying.

People engage in cyberbullying online and through social media in order to gratify themselves. Cyberbullying fulfills a need to be vengeful and malicious, while avoiding face-to-face contact. Similarly, besides information seeking, users who share news are motivated by U&G of socializing and status seeking, especially if they have had prior experience with social media.

Instant messaging
As with text messaging, similar U&G were studied with instant messaging, or participating in an "online chat," and these results were also mitigated by gender:
Relaxation
Entertainment
Fashion
Inclusion
Affection
Sociability
Escape

Again, differences were found based on amount of use and gender. Those who used the instant messaging service frequently ("heavy users") were found to be most motivated by affection and sociability; those who did not ("light users") were most motivated by fashion. Women chatted longer and for sociability; men chatted for less time per session and for entertainment and relaxation.

Comparing Instant Messaging with Facebook
Facebook offers features - such as direct messaging and group chats- that replicate functions that are available to users on instant messaging platforms. Studies using the uses and gratifications framework have found that media users may use social networking platforms because each platform offers its own unique gratifications for the users own unique needs and motivations for using the given platform. Using a comparative analysis between the needs and gratifications derived from Facebook and Instant Messaging, Quan-Haase and Young determined that users use Facebook to say in the know about fun activities/ happenings in user's own personal interpersonal circles, while Instant Messaging is more about developing new relationships and maintaining existing relationships

Online gaming
This new branch of research explores the U&G of starting to play games online. Achievement, enjoyment and social interaction are all motivations for starting to play an online game, and their success at the game as well as the extent to which their uses were gratified predicted their continuance in playing.

Mobile Gaming and Augmented Reality
In 2017, researchers applied Uses and Gratification Theory to study user behavior among Pokémon Go users. Results show that enjoyment, physical activity, nostalgia, image, normative influences and flow drive various forms of user behavior. In addition, perceived physical risks (but not perceived privacy risks) lead to weaker forms of usage. Findings of this study show that Uses and Gratification theory provides a promising framework to study Augmented Reality, and that U&GT provides a robust framework that can be supplemented with other theories.

Animated news
In 2011, a test was conducted with 312 college students to investigate their viewing of animated news. The use of melodramatic animation in news was seen as an emerging technique used in news reporting at the time. The respondents were given 59 statements to rate according to how well each of these statements applies to their viewing of animated news. Factor analysis and hierarchical regression were employed for data analysis.

In the study, seven motives were identified, through factor analysis, for viewing such animated news videos. These motives included companionship, social interaction, relaxation, information seeking, interpersonal learning, entertainment and pass time.
Social interaction motive: getting information for facilitating discussion with others
Relaxation motive: watching animated news to release pressure and unwind
Information-seeking motive: viewing animated news to stay abreast of current events or to search for information
Entertainment motive: viewing animated news for amusement and enjoyment
Pass time motive: viewing animated news to occupy time or when individuals have nothing better to do
Interpersonal learning motive: the desire to understand the minds of friends or significant others by watching the animated news videos that are shared by these individuals
Companionship motive: to alleviate loneliness

The results of hierarchical regression analysis suggest predictive relationships among personality characteristics (sensation seeking and locus of control), the seven motives, the effects of perceived news credibility and newsworthiness, and the intention to share such animated news videos with others.

Entertainment media
Research has shown that media taken in for entertainment purposes (i.e., movies, songs, television, etc.) have a wide range of uses and emotional gratifications, and that these are not mutually exclusive but can overlap with each other. Rehman (1983) demonstrated a relationship between gratifications sought and obtained from the movies and movie attendance.
Mood management: This is the most prominently cited emotional gratification of media use. People prefer to maintain a state of intermediate arousal; this is a pleasant medium. When in a bad mood, bored, or over-aroused, people will seek media as regulation for or distraction from their mood.
Affective disposition: Affective disposition theory states that people enjoy "rooting for" characters depicted as good and moral. Users experience gratification when good things happen to characters with "good" morals and also when bad things happen to "evil" or "bad" characters.
Excitation transfer: This use and gratification for media posits that people like to feel worried for characters we perceive as "good," and this is even more gratifying if that character gets "rewarded" in some way in the end. 
Sensation seeking: This use and gratification can be understood when considering excitement as its own reward. 
Modes of reception: "Emotional involvement correlates with other modes of reception, especially with diegetic involvement (getting absorbed in the fictional world), socio-involvement (identifying with characters), and ego-involvement (relating the film to one's own life). ...Emotional involvement can be helpful for the pursuit of a broader variety of goals in the reception process. ... It can be concluded that the experience of emotions can be functional in a number of other ways than just regulating emotions in terms of affective valence and arousal." 
Intrinsic motivation: If the user experiences a challenge to his or her media-related skills, but not to the point of being frustrated or overwhelmed, then the gratification is a reward in a feeling of competence that inspires the user to continue using the media in question. 
Mood adjustment: Users are gratified by using media to adjust their mood to whatever is currently happening. For instance, once already provoked by an aggressor and promised a chance to retaliate, males were found to prefer bad news over good news in that emotionally charged moment.
Gender socialization of emotions: This use is gratified by the idea that women enjoy feeling other-directed sadness (empathy, sympathy, and pity) because our culture values and validates women's feeling these; similarly, teenage couples like to watch scary movies so the male feels protective and the female feels vulnerable.
Relationship functions of entertainment: According to this particular branch of use and gratification, we use entertainment to apply lessons to or escape from our real-life relationships.
Parasocial relationships: Consumers of entertainment media sometimes use it to gratify a need for social connection by becoming very attached to characters seen in entertainment media, such as characters in a TV show or newscasters.
Vicarious experiences: A related use and gratification for entertainment media is the idea of living through the characters portrayed and imagining ourselves in their lives by adopting the characters' perspectives.
Downward social comparison: This use and gratification holds that we enjoy taking in media that portrays people similar or worse off than ourselves.
Eudaemonic motivation: Media consumers also turn to entertainment media to search for deeper meanings, insights, purpose for life, finding beauty, raising morale, experience strong emotions, and understand how others think and feel.

Use and Gratification through online communities

Communicating in online communities enables the interaction of people globally. There are four types of online communities that vary according to the individual’s need’s that need to be satisfied. There’s a community of interest that uses interpersonal communication to interact on a specific topic  There's communities of relationship which focus more on building personal and intimate relationships. It can also reunite people regarding more personal life experiences. Communities of transaction involving individuals who seek information buying and selling of products. Finally, there are communities of fantasy that allow participants to create a false reality by creating a new environment and personality.

Related theories

Media system dependency theory
Media system dependency theory (MSDT or media dependency theory) has been studied as an offshoot of UGT. However, media dependency theory focuses on audiences' goals for media consumption as the source of their dependency; while uses and gratification theory focuses on audience's needs as drivers for media consumption. MSDT states that as a person becomes increasingly dependent on media to satisfy their needs, that media will become more important in a person's life and thereby have increased influence and effects on that person. MSDT acknowledges and builds upon UGT because it is based on the assumptions that people have different uses for media that arise from their needs.

Social cognitive theory
Building on UGT, Social Cognitive Theory helped distinguish GS versus GO stimulus for media consumption. Social cognitive theory explains behavior in terms of the reciprocal causation between individuals, environments, and behaviors. This allows for a more personal application of UGT instead of a large, blanketing assumption about a large audience of mass media. If GO is greater than GS then there will be more audience satisfaction. Lastly, audiences' GS are not always the reality of their GO.

Cultivation theory 
Cultivation theory is concerned with understanding the role that media play in shaping a person's world view—specifically television. Whereas UGT tries to understand the motivations that drive media usage, Cultivation theory focuses on the psychological effects of media. Cultivation theory is used especially to study violence in television and how it shapes audience's understanding of the reality of violence in society. Often, because of media's influence, audiences have a more heightened and unrealistic perception of the amount of violence. A UGT approach may be implemented to Cultivation theory cases to understand why an audience would seek violent media and if audiences seek television violence to satisfy the need of confirmation of their worldview.

Hypodermic needle model 
Hypodermic needle model (known as the hypodermic-syringe model, transmission-belt model, or magic bullet theory) is a model of communication suggesting that an intended message is directly received and wholly accepted by the receiver. The model was originally rooted in 1930s behaviourism and largely considered obsolete for a long time, but big data analytics-based mass customisation has led to a modern revival of the basic idea. After that, a shift which rediscovered the relationship between media and people occurred and led to establishment of uses and gratifications approach.

Mass media 
In media studies, mass communication, media psychology, communication theory, and sociology, media influence and media effects are topics relating to mass media and media culture's effects on individual or an audience's thoughts, attitudes, and behavior. Whether it is written, televised, or spoken, mass media reaches a large audience. Mass media's role and effect in shaping modern culture are central issues for study of culture.

Theory criticism
Uses and gratifications has, almost since its inception, been viewed by some as the Pluto of communication theory, which is to say critics argue that it does not meet the standards necessary to be theory. Critics argue that it instead is more of an approach to analysis or a data-collecting strategy.
Among the criticism most commonly raised in academic literature:
Gratifications are more dependent on input by researchers than on decisions made by research subjects.
Early research required participants to identify gratifications associated with specific channels of communication, raising the possibility that they would conflate gratifications and channels. Lometti et al. argued that this could "substantially overestimate" the number of gratifications, and that attempts to address it using in-depth interviews were problematic (p. 323).
Audiences of different ages likely have different motivations for using identical media, and also likely have different gratifications.
Due to the individualistic nature of uses and gratification, it is difficult to take the information that is collected in studies. Most research relies on pure recollection of memory rather than data. This makes self-reports complicated and immeasurable.
The theory has been denounced by media hegemony advocates who say it goes too far in claiming that people are free to choose the media and the interpretations they desire.
Audiences interpret the media in their own terms and any debate for or against this can be argued, and depending on the circumstances, won by either side. Each individuals' actions and effects on those actions will depend solely on the situation. Each individual has unique uses to which the media attempts to meet their gratifications.

Using this sociologically-based theory has little to no link to the benefit of psychology due to its weakness in operational definitions and weak analytical mode. It also is focused too narrowly on the individual and neglects the social structure and place of the media in that structure. Ruggiero (2000) wrote that "most scholars agree that early research had little theoretical coherence and was primarily behaviorist and individualist in its methodological tendencies." Blumler (1979) and other critics have argued that line between gratification and satisfaction is blurred, and Blumler wrote that "the nature of the theory underlying uses and gratifications research is not totally clear."

Despite such criticism, contemporary thought suggests that uses and gratifications as theory may be in the process of gaining new life as a result of new communication technology. While it was easy to question the agency of media consumers who had three television networks from which to choose, it's much harder to argue that a consumer who now has 100 cable channels and Internet-streaming video is not making their own decisions. Sundar & Limperos (2013) write that what had been called the "audience" is now referred to as "users," and "usage implies volitional action, not simply passive reception."

Among the most criticized tenets of uses and gratifications as theory is the assumption of an active audience. Ruggerio (2000) noted three assumptions that are necessary to the idea of active audience: First, media selection is initiated by the individual. Second, expectations regarding the use of media must be a product of individual predispositions, social interactions and environmental factors. And third, the active audience exhibits goal-directed behavior. This concept of active audience finds, at best, limited acceptance outside of the United States.

Jay Blumler presented a number of interesting points, as to why Uses and Gratifications cannot measure an active audience. He stated, "The issue to be considered here is whether what has been thought about Uses and Gratifications Theory has been an article of faith and if it could now be converted into an empirical question such as: How to measure an active audience?" (Blumler, 1979). Blumler then offered suggestions about the kinds of activity the audiences were engaging with in the different types of media.
Utility: "Using the media to accomplish specific tasks"
Intentionality: "Occurs when people's prior motive determine use of media"
Selectivity: "Audience members' use of media reflect their existing interests"
Imperviousness to Influence: "Refers to audience members' constructing their own meaning from media content"

In 1973, Blumler, McQuail and Brown extended Lasswell's four groups. These included four more primary factors for which one may use the media: 
Diversion: Escape from routine and problems; an emotional release
Personal Relationships: Social utility of information in conversation; substitution of media for companionship
Personal Identity or Individual Psychology: Value reinforcement or reassurance; self-understanding, reality exploration
Surveillance: Information about factors which might affect one or will help one to do or to accomplish something

Katz, Gurevitch and Haas, also in 1973, saw mass media as a means by which individuals connect or disconnect themselves with others. They developed 35 needs taken from the largely speculative literature on the social and psychological functions of the mass media and put them into five categories: 
Cognitive Needs: Acquiring information, knowledge and understanding
Media Examples: Television (news), video (how-to), movies (documentaries or based on history)
Affective Needs: Emotion, pleasure, feelings
Media Examples: Movies, television (soap operas, sitcoms)
Personal Integrative Needs: Credibility, stability, status
Media Examples: Video
Social Integrative Needs: Family and friends
Media Examples: Internet (e-mail, instant messaging, chat rooms, social media)
Tension Release Needs: Escape and diversion
Media Examples: Television, movies, video, radio, internet

See also 

Influence of mass media
Outline of communication

References

Further reading 
Blumler, J. & Katz, E. (1974). The Uses of Mass Communication: Current Perspectives on Gratification Research. London, Beverley Hills: Sage.
Davenport, Lucinda. LaRose, Robert. Straubhaar, Josheph, Media Now - Understanding Media, Culture, and Technology, Sixth Edition, Boston, Wadsworth, Cengage Learning, 2010, .
DeFleur, M. L., and Ball-Rokeach, S. J. (1989). Theories of Mass Communication.
Grant, A. E., (1998, April). Dependency and control. Paper presented to the Annual Convention of the Association of Educators in Journalism and Mass Communications, Baltimore, Maryland.
Infante, Dominic A., Rancer, Andrew S., and Womack, Deanna F., eds. Building Communication Theory (1993). (pp. 204–412).
 
 
Katz, E. (1959). Mass communication research and the study of culture. Studies in Public Communication, 2, 1–6.
Katz, E., Blumler, J. G., & Gurevitch, M. (1974). Utilization of mass communication by the individual. In J. G. Blumler, & E. Katz (Eds.), The uses of mass communications: Current perspectives on gratifications research (pp. 19–32). Beverly Hills: Sage.
 
Laughey, Dan. Key Themes in Media Theory. "Behaviourism and Media Effects." (p 26–27).
Lazarsfeld, P.F. (1940). "Radio and the Printed Page." New York: Dvell, Sloan, Pearce.
 
McQuail, D., Blumler, J. G., & Brown, J. (1972). The television audience: A revised perspective. In D. McQuail (Ed.), Sociology of Mass Communication (pp. 135–65). Middlesex, England: Penguin.
McQuail, D. (1983). With Benefits to Hindsight : Reflections on Uses and Gratifications Research. Critical Studies in Mass Communication Theory: And Introduction. Beverly Hills, CA: Sage.
 
McQuail, D. (2010). McQuails Mass Communication Theory (6th ed.,). London, Thousand Oaks, New Delhi: Sage Publications.
 
 
Rehman, S. (1983). Correlation between gratifications sought and obtained from the movies.Doctoral dissertation, Bowling Green State University, Ohio.
Roger, Tony, "Why Are Newspapers Dying?", About.com, Retrieved 2 November 2011.
Rubin, A. M., & Windahl, S. (1982). Mass media uses and dependency: A social systems approach to uses and gratifications. Paper presented to the meeting of the International Communication Association, Boston, MA.
 

Communication theory